Albert Huybrechts (12 February 1899 in Dinant – 21 February 1938 in Brussels) was a Belgian composer.

Life
Albert Huybrechts was born into a musical family.  His father, Joseph-Jacques Huybrechts, was the double-bassist with the Royal Theatre of La Monnaie, and his great grand-uncle was the renowned cellist Adrien-François Servais  Albert entered the Royal Conservatory of Brussels at age 11, studying under Joseph Jongen, P. Marchand and Léon Du Bois In 1915, age 16, he won an award for oboe at the Conservatory.

In 1920 his father died, leaving the 21-year-old Albert a "small inheritance." He won a prize for fugue with Joseph Jongen in 1922, and in 1926 his First String Quartet (1924) took first prize at the Frost-Coolidge Music Festival in Ojai, California.  A few days later his Sonata for violin and piano (1925) won the prestigious Elizabeth Sprague Coolidge award.

Unfortunately, with his inheritance invested in the stock market, the Wall Street crash of 1929 wiped him out, and a thwarted love affair in the 1930s further diminished his strength. At professor Jean Absil's recommendation, in January 1938 Huybrechts was appointed as a junior lecturer in harmony at the Royal Conservatory of Brussels, but barely a month later, on 21 February 1938, he died unexpectedly of kidney failure aged 39.

Works
Stage
 Agamemnon, Incidental Music after Aeschylus for tenor, baritone, male chorus and orchestra (1932–1933)

Orchestra
 David, Poème symphonique (1923)
 Poème féerique (1923)
 Sérénade en 3 mouvements (1929)
 Chant d'angoisse (1930)
 Nocturne (1931)

Concertante
 Chant funèbre for cello and orchestra (1926); also for cello and piano
 Concertino for cello and orchestra (1932)

Chamber music
 String Quartet No. 1 (1924)
 Sonata for violin and piano (1925)
 Chant funèbre for cello and piano (1926); also orchestrated
 Trio for flute, viola and piano (1926)
 String Quartet No. 2 (1927)
 Sextuor (Pastorale) for 2 flute, oboe, clarinet, horn and bassoon (1927)
 Suite for flute, oboe, clarinet, bassoon and piano (1929)
 Divertissement for brass and percussion (1931)
 Pastourelle for cello or viola da gamba and piano (1934)
 Sonatine for flute and viola (1934)
 Piano Trio (1935)
 Quintette à vent (Woodwind Quintet) for flute, oboe, clarinet, horn and bassoon (1936)
 Aesope for string quartet

Organ
 Choral (1930)

Piano
 Sicilienne (1934)

Vocal
 Les roses de Saadi for soprano and piano (1919); words by Marceline Desbordes-Valmore
 Cétait un soir de féeries for soprano and piano (1920); words by Francis Viélé-Griffin
 Chant d'automne for soprano and piano (1920); words by Charles Baudelaire
 Deux poèmes for mezzo-soprano and string quartet (1923); words by Emile Verhaeren
 Horoscopes for soprano and piano (1926); words by Francis James
 Trois poèmes for mezzo-soprano and piano (1928); words by Edgar Allan Poe in translation by Stéphane Mallarmé
 Eldorado for soprano or mezzo-soprano and orchestra (1928); words by Edgar Allan Poe in translation by Stéphane Mallarmé
 Prière pour avoir une femme simple for tenor and piano or orchestra (1934); words by Francis James
 Mirliton for soprano and piano (1934); words by Tristan Corbière

Influence
Composer Daniel Denis, of the Belgian progressive rock band Univers Zero, cites Huybrechts as a major influence on his composing.

Discography
 David - Serenade for Orchestra - L'Orchestre National De Belgique/René Defossez.  Decca BAT 133200, 1950s
 Musique Belge Contemporaine - Gérard Ruymen, André Isselee, Quatuor Rondo, Pauline Marcelle, Raymonde Serverius. Alpha DBM-133 C, 1970s
 Musique Belge Contemporaine - Quatuor Rondo: Raymond Corbeel, René Philippo, Marcel Ancion, Iwein d’Haese, Gisèle Demoulin. Alpha DBM-F182, 1970s 
 Sonate Pour Violon Et Piano / Deuxième Quatuor - Clemens Quatacker, Jean-Claude Vanden Eynden, Le Quatuor Quatacker.  Deutsche Grammophon 0100 125, 1979
 Sonatas for Violin And Piano - André Gousseau, Mary Elizabeth Sadun. Pavane ADW 7047, 1981
 Sonatas For Violin And Piano - Edith Volckaert, Jean-Claude Vanden Eynden.  Queen Elisabeth Competition 1980 038, 1983
 Musique de Chambre - Quatour de l'Opera National de Belgique.  Koch Schwann Musica Mundi CD 310 030 H1, 1988
 Shostakovich - Huybrechts - Edith Volckaert, Eugene De Canck. René Gailly CD86 003, 1993
 Chamber Music for Wind Instruments - Wind Ensemble Quintessens. René Gailly CD92 020, 1994
 Sonatine - Sonate - Trio - Marc Grauwels, Jacques Dupriez, Dominique Cornil, Véronique Bogaerts.  Syrinx CRS98101, 2000
 Musique de Chambre I - Pierre Amoyal, Marie Hallynck, David Lively, Yuko Shimizu-Amoyal. Cypres CYP4630, 2009
 Musique de Chambre II - Laure Delcampe, Marie Lenormand, Martial Defontaine, Lionel Bams, Quator MP4. Cypres CYP4635, 2011
 Musique de Chambre III - Solistes de l'Orchestre Symphonique de la Monnaie/De Munt. Cypres CYP4639, 2013
 Sonatas for Violin And Piano - Guido De Neve, Jan Michiels. Pavane ADW 7509, 2013
 Huybrechts Chamber Music - Aldo Baerton, Diederick Suys, Frauke Suys, Maiko Inoué.  UT3 Records 026, 2016
 Early 20th Century Jewels -  Nozomi Kanda, Daniel Rubenstein. DUX CD 1340, 2017

See also
Catalog of works

References

External links
 Albert Huybrechts official site 
 Albert Huybrechts at Centre Belge de Documentation Musicale
 Koninklijk Conservatorium Brussel now houses most works and manuscripts of Huybrechts, after the bankruptcy of CeBeDeM in 2015.

1899 births
1938 deaths
Belgian composers
Male composers
Royal Conservatory of Brussels alumni
Academic staff of the Royal Conservatory of Brussels
People from Dinant
Deaths from kidney failure
20th-century composers
20th-century Belgian male musicians